Miroľa is a village and municipality in Svidník District in the Prešov Region of north-eastern Slovakia.

History
In historical records the village was first mentioned in 1572.

Geography
The municipality lies at an altitude of 367 metres and covers an area of 6.112 km². It has a population of about 73 people.

References

External links
 
https://web.archive.org/web/20070513023228/http://www.statistics.sk/mosmis/eng/run.html

Villages and municipalities in Svidník District
Šariš